Border Hindustan Ka (Border of India) is a 2003 Indian Bollywood war film directed by Yogesh Bharadwaj and produced by H.S. Taneja. It stars Aditya Pancholi, Faisal Khan, Priya Gill, Rajat Bedi and Mink Singh in pivotal roles.

Cast
Faisal Khan as Lt. Rajvir Singh
Rajat Bedi as Hari Singh
Aditya Pancholi as Ranbir Singh
Priya Gill as Nargis
Mink Brar as Manjeet
Dina Pathak as Dadi, Nargis' grandmother.
Dalip Tahil as Sarfraz
Ashish Vidyarthi as Major Ansari
Dara Singh as Jarnail Singh
Akshaye Khanna as Mobarak (special appearance)
Sudesh Berry as Jaffar / Jannisar (dual role)
Anil Nagrath as Mobarak's father (special appearance)

Soundtrack

References

External links

2000s Hindi-language films
2003 films
India–Pakistan relations in popular culture
Indian Army in films
Military of Pakistan in films
Indian war films